The 47th Infantry Division was a formation of the United States Army active from 1946 to 1991. It was provided by the Army National Guard. The division was created on 10 June 1946 as a National Guard infantry division from the efforts of Minnesota's Adjutant General Ellard Walsh. The division was built from scratch with veteran transfers and new recruits, mostly from Minnesota and North Dakota, under the command of Major General Norman Hendrickson. General Hendrickson was the Chief-of-Staff for the 34th Division in the North African and Italian campaigns in 1943 and the IX Corps in occupied Japan.

Units of the division were allotted to the Minnesota National Guard, and North Dakota National Guard. The division never saw combat throughout its history, although it was federalized and sent to Camp Rucker, Alabama from 1951 to 1954 during the Korean War. During the Korean War the division was used as a replacement division, and its men and units transferred to Regular Army units. It returned to state control, and its home state, in 1953. The unit returned to Minnesota, with active army personnel from Camp Rucker taking a convoy from Fort Benning, Georgia in 1954.

The division's North Dakota elements were transferred out in 1959 during a service-wide reconfiguration to the Pentomic structure. Infantry regiments were dropped and replaced by battle groups bearing the regimental number (1st Battle Group, 135th Infantry, for example) as well as numerous other redesignations and reconfigurations. It became an entirely Minnesotan division. The division was again reorganized in 1963, this time according to the Reorganization Objective Army Division (ROAD) structure.  Battle group designations were dropped and substituted by battalions assigned flexibly to brigades.  Several other significant redesignations and changes were also made.

The most sweeping reorganization occurred in February 1968.  Principal among them was the extension of the division into Iowa and Illinois as a result of Pentagon-mandated cutbacks of the Guard in those states.  Iowa's 67th Brigade was disbanded, redesignated as the 34th Infantry Brigade, and assigned to the Viking Division.  In Illinois, units of the disbanded 33rd Infantry Division were reorganized into the 66th Infantry Brigade and made part of the 47th Division.

In December 1965, the division became one of three National Guard divisions earmarked for the Selected Reserve Force, capable of more rapid deployment. This status was removed on 1 February 1968.

The division was deactivated in 1991. Immediately afterward, the division's former units were reactivated as the 34th Infantry Division. Effectively, the division was renamed, but for official lineage purposes, the Department of the Army does not recognize any continuity.

The 47th Infantry Division remained on the rolls longer than any other National Guard division that did not see combat (45 years of service). The only Army division that did not see combat to have remained on the rolls longer is the Army Reserve's 108th Infantry Division, elements of which have seen action now in Iraq and Afghanistan.

Commanders
Norman E. Hendrickson	(1 Aug 1946 – 20 Jan 1954)
Philip C. Bettenburg		(25 Jan 1954 – 31 Jan 1958)
Richard Cook			(1 Feb 1958 – 14 Jan 1960)
Robert P. Miller		(15 Jan 1960 – 6 Oct 1963)
Donald C. Grant		(7 Oct 1963 – 31 Mar 1971)
Paul V. Meyer			(1 Apr 1971 – 27 Sep 1973)
William S. Lundberg Jr.	(28 Sep 1973 – 30 Jan 1976)
James S. O'Brien		(1 Jul 1976 – 23 Jun 1979)
Robert G. Walker		(24 Jun 1979 – 31 Oct 1982)
Edward W. Waldon		(1 Nov 1982 – 8 Dec 1985)
Allan R. Meixner		(9 Dec 1985 – 20 Sep 1986)
Robert L. Blevins		(21 Sep 1986 – 31 Oct 1988)
David H. Lueck		(1 Nov 1988 – 10 Feb 1991)

Notes

References
Wilson, John B. (1997). Maneuver and Firepower: The Evolution of Divisions and Separate Brigades. Washington, D.C.: Center of Military History.
MILITARY HISTORICAL SOCIETY OF MINNESOTA, The 47th “Viking” Infantry Division: Minnesota’s Cold War Division
Official 47th Infantry Division Facebook page
Robert Blevins Biography

Divisions of the United States Army National Guard
047 Infantry Division
Military units and formations established in 1946
Military units and formations disestablished in 1991